The men's ISSF 25 meter rapid fire pistol competition at the 2000 Summer Olympics was held on 20 and 21 September. There were 20 competitors from 17 nations. Nations had been limited to two shooters each since the 1952 Games. The event was won by Sergei Alifirenko of Russia, the nation's first medal independent of the Soviet Union. Michel Ansermet's silver was Switzerland's first medal in the event since 1920; Iulian Raicea's bronze was Romania's first since 1984.

Background

This was the 21st appearance of what had been standardised in 1948 as the men's ISSF 25 meter rapid fire pistol event, the only event on the 2020 programme that traces back to 1896. The event has been held at every Summer Olympics except 1904 and 1928 (when no shooting events were held) and 1908; it was nominally open to women from 1968 to 1980, although very few women participated these years. The first five events were quite different, with some level of consistency finally beginning with the 1932 event—which, though it had differences from the 1924 competition, was roughly similar. The 1936 competition followed the 1932 one quite closely. The post-World War II event substantially altered the competition once again. The 1984 Games introduced women's-only shooting events, including the ISSF 25 meter pistol (though this is more similar to the non-Olympic men's ISSF 25 meter center-fire pistol than the rapid fire pistol).

Six of the eight finalists from 1996 returned: two-time gold medalist (and 1988 silver medalist Ralf Schumann of Germany, silver medalist Emil Milev of Bulgaria, two-time bronze medalist Vladimir Vokhmyanin of Kazakhstan, two-time fourth-place finisher Krzysztof Kucharczyk of Poland, seventh-place finisher Lajos Pálinkás of Hungary, and eighth-place finisher Daniel Leonhard of Germany. Schumann had won the world championship again in 1998 (after winning in 1990 and finishing third in 1994) and held the world records for both qualifying and total; he was heavily favored in this event. Leonhard and Romanian Iulian Raicea had finished second and third at the 1998 worlds.

Belarus made its debut in the event. The United States made its 18th appearance, most of any nation.

Competition format

The competition format continued to use the two-round (qualifying round and final) format, as in 1988 and 1996.

The qualifying round from 1988 onward was essentially the same as the full competition format from 1948–1984. Each shooter fired 60 shots. These were done in two courses of 30; each course consisted of two stages of 15; each stage consisted of three series of 5. In each stage, the time limit for each series was 8 seconds for the first, 6 seconds for the second, and 4 seconds for the third. 

The 1988 tournament had added a two-series final for the top eight shooters; the 1992 competition broke that down to a four-series semifinal for the top eight and two-series final for the top four. In 1996 and 2000, the top eight once again advanced to the final.

In the final, each shooter fired two five-shot series at 4 seconds. Scoring in the final was to 1/10 of a point, with each shot worth up to 10.9 points (for a final round maximum of 109, and total maximum of 709).

The 1992 competition had introduced round targets rather than the silhouettes used from 1948 to 1988 as well as many pre-World War II versions of the event. Score, rather than hits, had been used as the primary ranking method since 1960.

Records

The existing world and Olympic records were as follows.

Schedule

Results

Qualifying

Two-time defending champion and heavy favorite Schumann received a two-point penalty for unsuccessfully protesting a score of 8 on a shot, barely qualifying for the final and putting him 3 points behind the three-way tie for the lead (a very difficult score to make up with only 10 shots in the final).

Final

Schumann's 2-point penalty ultimately cost him the bronze medal; if his protest had been successful, however, he would have been in position to receive silver. Alifirenko's 100.6 gave him the gold medal regardless.

References

Sources

Shooting at the 2000 Summer Olympics
Men's 2000
Men's events at the 2000 Summer Olympics